Mount Hemmingsen is a mountain at the northeast end of the Werner Mountains, located on the south side of Meinardus Glacier,  southwest of Court Nunatak, in Palmer Land, Antarctica. It was mapped by the United States Geological Survey from surveys and U.S. Navy air photos, 1961–67, and was named by the Advisory Committee on Antarctic Names for Edvard A. Hemmingsen, a biologist at McMurdo Station in the summer of 1966–67, and at Palmer Station, 1967–68.

References

Mountains of Palmer Land